Eupera guaraniana is a species of freshwater mollusk inhabiting the Uruguay River in South America. The species was discovered in 1994 by Cristián Ituarte.

References 

Sphaeriidae
Molluscs of Argentina